Lotfabad (also Romanized as Loţfābād) is a village in Rud Ab-e Gharbi Rural District, Rud Ab District, Narmashir County, Kerman Province, Iran. A census in 2006 counted 582 people and 143 families in the village.

References 

Populated places in Narmashir County